Olchfa School is the largest secondary school in Swansea, South Wales, with approximately 1,700 pupils, including 357 in the Sixth Form. Situated in Sketty Park to the west of Sketty, it provides secondary education for GCSE and A-Level qualifications. Olchfa (part of the Sketty Swansea suburb) means 'washing place' in the English language. 

Around 12% of pupils have a special educational need and 1.7% have a statement of special educational needs. Both of these figures are below the Welsh averages of 21.5% and 2% respectively. Nearly a quarter of pupils come from an ethnic minority background and just over 20% speak English as an additional language.

Academic performance
In its most recent Estyn inspection in 2018, Olchfa School received the highest possible judgement, 'Excellent' in all five inspection areas. In the same year, the school reported a GCSE pass rate of 83% (based on 5 GCSEs, grades A*-C), placing it in the top six schools in Wales.

Facilities
The school consists of different sections - the main building, a south block, P.E. department as well as a maths and science block. The school also consists of smaller demountable classrooms throughout the plot that teach a variety of subjects. There is also an on-site specialist facility supporting the needs of hearing impaired pupils.

Notable former pupils

Sports
 Daniel Alfei, Welsh U21 International and former Swansea City footballer. 
 Simon Davey, former Swansea City footballer and football manager
 Aaron Lewis, Welsh U21 International and Newport County footballer
 Mark Harris, Welsh International and Cardiff City footballer
 David Hemp, Bermudan International Cricketer
 Charles Lowen, English International Cricketer
 Richie Rees, Rugby Player
 Ellie Simmonds OBE, Paralympian Gold Medalist Swimmer
 Harrison Walsh, F64 Discus Commonwealth and European bronze medalist 

Other
 Richard Barrett, Composer

 Russell T Davies, Television Writer
 Sir Andrew Dilnot, Economist
 Joe Dunthorne, poet and author
 Liz Fuller, Presenter, Actress and Model
 Stephen Harris, rock musician with stage name "Kid Chaos"
 Georgia Henshaw, Actress
 Nerys Jefford, High Court judge
 Andrew Jones, Film producer
 Heather Nicholson, animal rights activist

References

External links
School website

Secondary schools in Swansea
1969 establishments in Wales